Billy Dwayne Ledford (born November 2, 1976) is an American football coach and former player who is the offensive line coach for the Atlanta Falcons of the National Football League (NFL). Ledford played professionally as a center in the National Football League (NFL) for the San Francisco 49ers (1999–2000, 2003–2004), the Jacksonville Jaguars (2000), the Carolina Panthers (2001), and the Cleveland Browns (2005). He is a graduate of McDowell High School in Marion, North Carolina, where he was a two-time All-Conference selection and led the team in quarterback sacks three straight years.

References

External links
 Louisville profile
 Gardner–Webb profile
 

1976 births
Living people
American football centers
Appalachian State Mountaineers football coaches
Carolina Panthers players
Cleveland Browns players
East Carolina Pirates football coaches
East Carolina Pirates football players
Frankfurt Galaxy coaches
Gardner–Webb Runnin' Bulldogs football coaches
Louisville Cardinals football coaches
Jacksonville Jaguars players
North Carolina Tar Heels football coaches
Rhein Fire players
San Francisco 49ers players
Tennessee State Tigers football coaches
High school football coaches in North Carolina
People from Morganton, North Carolina
People from McDowell County, North Carolina
Players of American football from North Carolina
Atlanta Falcons coaches